Helmore is a surname. Notable people with the surname include:

Basil Helmore (1897–1973), Australian businessman
Des Helmore (born 1940), New Zealand artist
George Helmore (1862–1922), New Zealand rugby union player
Heathcote Helmore (1894–1965), New Zealand architect
Thomas Helmore (1811–1890), English choirmaster
Tom Helmore (1904–1995), English actor
William Helmore (1894–1964), English engineer